Bob Schoutsen (born 19 July 1951) is a retired backstroke swimmer from the Netherlands, who competed for his native country at the  1968 and 1972 Summer Olympics. His best individual result was sixth place in the 100 m backstroke (1:01.8) in 1968. He won a bronze medal in the same event at the 1970 European Aquatics Championships.

References

1951 births
Living people
Olympic swimmers of the Netherlands
Dutch male backstroke swimmers
Swimmers at the 1968 Summer Olympics
Swimmers at the 1972 Summer Olympics
Swimmers from Amsterdam
European Aquatics Championships medalists in swimming
20th-century Dutch people